The 2001 season was the Denver Broncos' 32nd in the National Football League (NFL) and their 42nd overall. This was the Broncos' first year at the new Invesco Field at Mile High, replacing the old Mile High Stadium. The Broncos, heavily favored to be the AFC Super Bowl XXXVI representative, were aiming to head back to the Super Bowl for the first time in three years, and to win their third title in the Shanahan era. However, the season ended up as highly disappointing, as the team finished with an 8-8 record and missed the playoffs. The season was also a start of a multi-year investigation into the team cheating the salary cap during the 1996 season and both their Super Bowl-winning seasons. The team was stripped of their third-round pick in the 2002 draft, and received an initial fine of $968,000. 

It was also Terrell Davis' final season before various knee ailments forced him to retire in the 2002 preseason.

Offseason

NFL Draft

Draft notes

Staff

Roster

Regular season 
The Broncos opened the 2001 NFL season with a Monday Night Football win over the New York Giants on September 10, 2001, in their new stadium, Invesco Field at Mile High. Wide receiver Ed McCaffrey suffered a season-ending injury with a broken leg. The late game and location would serve a role in sparing at least two lives the following day during the September 11th attacks.

Schedule

Standings

Awards and records

References 

 Broncos on Pro Football Reference
 Broncos Schedule on jt-sw.com

Denver Broncos
Denver Broncos seasons
Denver Broncos